Jack Telnack (born John J. Telnack in 1937) is the former global Vice President of Design of the Ford Motor Company from 1980 to 1997. He is best known for his work with cars like the 1979 Ford Mustang (third generation), the 1983 Ford Thunderbird (ninth generation), and the 1986 Ford Taurus that ushered in a new era of aerodynamic design to America's mainstream marketplace.

Career 

After his training at the Art Center College of Design, Telnack began working as a designer for Ford in 1958, and became the head stylist of the Lincoln-Mercury Division in 1965. In 1966, he became the chief designer of Ford's Australian branch, where he led the redesign of the Ford Falcon, and served as the Vice President of Design for Ford of Europe in 1974. 

Ushering a new era of aerodynamic design to America's mainstream marketplace, Telnack and his team of designers were responsible for cars like the 1979 Ford Mustang (third generation), the 1983 Ford Thunderbird (ninth generation), the 1984 Ford Tempo and the 1984 Continental Mark VII were moderate successes that showed Ford's intention to change their traditional design language for a more contemporary, European style.

Telnack and his team of designers were also responsible for the 1986 Ford Taurus, which was a car widely acknowledged as the main reason why Ford Motor Company's turnaround strategy was successful during the 1980s. He and his designers were known collectively as "Team Taurus". The Taurus' wind-cheating design language influenced everything from the Ford F-150 to the Lincoln Town Car in the 1990s. The Taurus's sibling, the 1986 Mercury Sable, boasted a wind cheating drag coefficient of 0.29. The Sable's light bar grille continued to be a Mercury design hallmark for the next decade. Telnack also helped shape the 1989 Ford Probe and 1993 Lincoln Mark VIII.

Later years at Ford 
Toward the end of his career, Telnack worked on the ovoid-themed 1996 third generation Taurus. While criticized widely and deemed too radical for the market's tastes, Telnack also created the "New Edge" style that brought about cars like the 1996 Ford Ka, Ford GT90 concept car and influenced the design of the 1998 Ford Focus. Telnack retired from his post at the end of 1997, and was replaced by J Mays.

References

External links
 Ward's Auto Guide article on Telnack's retirement
PR Newswire article on Telnack's career and retirement

1937 births
Living people
Ford designers
American automobile designers
20th-century American businesspeople